Huamuxtitlán is one of the 81 municipalities of Guerrero, in south-western Mexico. The municipal seat lies at Huamuxtitlán. The municipality covers an area of 432.5 km².

In 2005, the municipality had a total population of 13,806.

References

Municipalities of Guerrero